William Rose (fl. 1411–1435), of Canterbury, Kent, was an English politician.

Family
He married Alice St Cler and they had one son.

Career
Rose was a Member of Parliament for Canterbury, Kent in 1411, 1423, 1429 and 1435.

References

Year of birth missing
Year of death missing
People from Canterbury
English MPs 1411
English MPs 1423
English MPs 1429
English MPs 1435